The Bells of Dublin is a 1991 album of Christmas songs and traditional carols by the Irish band The Chieftains. The album features guest performances by various artists, including Elvis Costello, Jackson Browne, Kate & Anna McGarrigle, Marianne Faithfull, Nanci Griffith, Rickie Lee Jones and the actor Burgess Meredith.  
  
Writing in the album's liner notes, Paddy Moloney said, "These recording sessions hold special memories for The Chieftains and myself, and bring together all the colours of this festive season."

Track listing
All songs traditional, except as indicated.

"The Bells of Dublin; Christmas Eve" (with the bell-ringers of Christ Church Cathedral, Dublin) (Paddy Moloney)
"Past Three O'Clock" (with The Renaissance Singers)
"St. Stephen's Day Murders" (with Elvis Costello) (P. Moloney, E. Costello)
"Il Est Né/Ca Berger" (with Kate and Anna McGarrigle)
"Don Oíche Úd i mBeithil" (with Burgess Meredith)
"I Saw Three Ships A Sailing" (with Marianne Faithfull)
"A Breton Carol" (with Nolwen Monjarret)
"Carols Medley: O the Holly She Bears a Berry/God Rest Ye Merry Gentlemen/The Boar's Head"
"The Wexford Carol" (with Nanci Griffith)
"The Rebel Jesus" (with Jackson Browne) (J. Browne)
"Skyline Jig" (P. Moloney)
"O Holy Night" (with Rickie Lee Jones)
"Medley: 'The Wren! The Wren!'/The Dingle Set – Dance/The Wren in the Furze/A Dance Duet – Reels/Brafferton Village/Walsh's Hornpipe/The Farewell" ("Wren in the Furze" by Kevin Conneff)
"Medley: Once in Royal David's City/Ding Dong Merrily on High/O Come All Ye Faithful" (with The Renaissance Singers)

Personnel
Derek Bell – harp, tiompán, harpsichord
Martin Fay – fiddle
Seán Keane – fiddle
Kevin Conneff – bodhrán, vocals
Matt Molloy – flute
Paddy Moloney – uilleann pipes, tin whistle
The Renaissance Singers – vocals
Ronnie Lee – choirmaster
Elvis Costello – vocals
Jackson Browne – vocals, piano
Kate McGarrigle – vocals
Anna McGarrigle – vocals
Burgess Meredith – narration
Marianne Faithfull – vocals
Nolwen Monjarret – vocals
Phil Callery – vocals
Fran McPhail – vocals
Gerry Cullen – vocals
Nanci Griffith – vocals
Rickie Lee Jones – vocals
Suzie Katayama – cello
Brendan Begley – accordion
Kathryn Tickell – northumbrian pipes
David Drinkel – organ, St Anne's Cathedral, Belfast
Bell-ringers of Christ Church Cathedral, Dublin

Certifications

References

The Chieftains albums
1991 Christmas albums
Christmas albums by Irish artists
RCA Records Christmas albums
Folk Christmas albums
Collaborative albums